The Allure of Danger is a 1950 West German drama film directed by Eugen York and starring Angelika Hauff,  Walter Richter and Berta Drews. It was screened at the 1950 Venice Film Festival.

It was shot at the Wandsbek Studios and on location around Hamburg. The film's sets were designed by the art director Mathias Matthies.

Synopsis
A boy befriends a fisherman.

Cast
 Angelika Hauff as Tessy
 Walter Richter as Jens
 Adi Lödel as Uli
 Berta Drews as Ulis Mutter
 Werner Riepel as Kalli
 Marga Maasberg as Frau Schwenz
 Willibald Alexis  as Sänger
 Addi Adametz as Lilo
 Alexander Hunzinger as Wirt Willy
 Rudi Gerdes as Onje
 Kurt A. Jung as Hendrik
 Bruce Low
 Liselotte Malkowsky as Sing

References

Bibliography
 Youngkin, Stephen. The Lost One: A Life of Peter Lorre. University Press of Kentucky, 2005.

External links 
 

1950 films
1950 drama films
German drama films
West German films
1950s German-language films
Films directed by Eugen York
Seafaring films
Films set in Hamburg
Films shot at Wandsbek Studios
Real Film films
German black-and-white films
1950s German films